There are multiple places named Birmingham in the U.S. state of Ohio:
Birmingham, Coshocton County, Ohio
Birmingham, Erie County, Ohio
Birmingham, Guernsey County, Ohio